Secret ( is a South Korean television series starring Kim Ha-neul, Ha Ji-won, Ryu Si-won and Kim Min-jong. It aired on MBC from September 13 to November 9 on Wednesdays and Thursdays at 21:00 for 18 episodes.

Plot 
Ji-eun and Hee-jung live with their father Jong-man, a truck driver. When Ji-eun finds out her sister is the daughter of a famous fashion designer, she takes over her place and, led by jealousy, commits many misdeeds.

Cast 
 Kim Ha-neul as Lee Hee-jung 
 Ha Ji-won as Lee Ji-eun 
 Ryu Si-won as Kim Jun-ho 
 Kim Min-jong as Cho Young-min 
 Park Geun-hyung as Lee Jong-man 
 Lee Ah-hyun as Team Captain Ha Mi-ra 
 Kim Hyo-jin as Cho Young-ran (Young-min's sister) 
 Lee Dong-wook as Kang Hyun-soo
 Lee Hwi-hyang as Yoon Myung-ae
 Han Mi as Hyun-joo

References

External links 
  
 Cineseoul profile

MBC TV television dramas
2000 South Korean television series debuts
2000 South Korean television series endings
Korean-language television shows
South Korean melodrama television series